Stawka większa niż życie (More Than Life at Stake, Stakes Larger Than Life or Playing for High Stakes) was a Polish black and white TV series about the adventures of a Polish secret agent in Soviet service, captain Hans Kloss (real name Stanisław Kolicki, codename J-23), who acts as a double agent in the Abwehr during Second World War in occupied Poland.

Its precursor was a television play of the same name, broadcast live in 1965 by Telewizja Polska. 14 episodes of the play were made, with the two main characters, the protagonist, Abwehr Hauptmann Hans Kloss, and his key antagonist, SS-Obersturmführer Hermann Brunner, portrayed respectively by actors Stanisław Mikulski and Emil Karewicz. The popularity of the play led to the creation of the TV series; Mikulski and Karewicz returned to portray Kloss and Brunner.

The series was filmed from March 1967 to October 1968. There were 18 episodes, 9 of which were directed by Janusz Morgenstern and the other 9 by Andrzej Konic. The show was very popular in Poland, the USSR, Yugoslavia, and former Czechoslovakia. Re-runs are regularly broadcast on Polish TV.

Both the character of Hans Kloss, and that of Max von Stierlitz, the protagonist of the similarly themed Russian TV series Seventeen Moments of Spring, were allegedly inspired by the real-life exploits of Nikolai Kuznetsov, who had successfully infiltrated Nazi armed forces under the guise of a German officer.

Cast 

Stanisław Mikulski (lieutenant, later, captain Hans Kloss/J-23) - main role
Emil Karewicz (Hermann Brunner, support role)
Bronisław Pawlik (Kloss's contact)
Mieczysław Stoor  (Sturmführer Stedtke)
Seweryn Butrym (general Wiehringer)
Janina Borońska (radio operator Irena)
Krzysztof Chamiec (Sturmbannführer Lothar)
Alicja Zommer  (doctor Marta Becher)
Lucyna Winnicka (Ingrid Heizer, owner of "Cafe Ingrid")
Tadeusz Bartosik  (Lobler, owner "Excelsior")
Andrzej Konic (Georg, contact in Gdańsk)
Mieczysław Kalenik (Hans Diederlich, teacher)
Igor Śmiałowski (engineer Reil)
Leon Niemczyk (Rioletto)
Lech Ordon (Puschke)
Marian Opania (Kazik Truchanowicz)
Tadeusz Kalinowski (Kreisleiter)
Tadeusz Schmidt (major Horst)
Krystyna Feldman (Reil's secretary)
Alina Janowska (Rose Arens, owner of "Cafe Rose")
Janusz Bylczyński (councilor Witte)
Edmund Fetting (Christopulis)
Leon Pietraszkiewicz (owner of inn "Orient")
Mieczysław Voit (prince Mdżawanadze)
Iga Cembrzyńska (Benita von Henning)
Ignacy Gogolewski (captain Ruppert)
Ewa Wiśniewska (Anna)
Mariusz Dmochowski (Gruppenführer Fischer)
Piotr Pawłowski (Adam Schmidt)
Jolanta Zykun (Agnieszka)
Władysław Hańcza (count Edwin Wąsowski)
Gustaw Lutkiewicz (Sturmbannführer Lohse)
Ignacy Machowski (Standartenführer Diblius)
Wiesława Mazurkiewicz (major Hanna Bösel)
Henryk Bąk (councilor Gebhard)
Adam Pawlikowski (captain Boldt)
Feliks Żukowski (colonel Kornel)
Czesław Wołłejko (Sturmbannführer Geibel)
Janusz Kłosiński (Józef Filipiak "Filip")
Bogusław Sochnacki (Zając)
Zdzisław Mrożewski (colonel Kraft)
Maciej Damięcki (2 roles: Wacek Słowikowski, Eryk Słowikowski vel Eryk Getting)
Józef Nalberczak (Wojtek)
Joanna Jędryka (Basia Borzemska)
Jan Englert (Tadek)
August Kowalczyk (Sturmbannführer Dehne)
Bolesław Płotnicki (Józef Podlasiński)
Władysław Kowalski (Adam Pruchnal)
Stanisław Niwiński (lt. Neumann)
Jerzy Trela (Romek)
Józef Nowak (partisan commander)
Jerzy Nowak (tailor Skowronek)
Lidia Korsakówna (Jeanne Mole)
Eliasz Kuziemski (major Elert)
Leszek Herdegen (2 roles: lt. von Vormann, English colonel)
Leonard Pietraszak (Hubert Ornel)
Edward Linde-Lubaszenko (Wehrmacht officer)
Zdzisław Kuźniar (Wehrmacht officer)
Igor Przegrodzki (doctor)
Beata Tyszkiewicz (Christin Kield)
Ryszard Filipski (Sturmbannführer Schabe)
Jerzy Block (Oskar)
Anna Seniuk (łączniczka)
Witold Pyrkosz (Obersturmbannführer Kleist)
Zygmunt Malanowicz (Johann Streit)
Zdzisław Maklakiewicz (Untersturmführer Abusch)
Ryszard Kotys (agent Z-82)
Henryk Hunko (lt. Schlosser)
Aleksandra Zawieruszanka (Edyta Lausch)
Józef Kostecki (captain Schneider)
Stanisław Zaczyk (major Broch)
Andrzej Herder (Klossa aide)
Józef Łodyński (Wasiak)
Halina Kossobudzka (Inga Glass)
Jerzy Kaliszewski (professor Glass)
Janusz Paluszkiewicz (Tomala)
Stanisław Jasiukiewicz (general Pfister)
Andrzej Krasicki (Sturmbannführer Knoch)
Teresa Kamińska (Simone)
Barbara Burska (Janka)
Eugeniusz Priwieziencew (Polish paratrooper)
Barbara Brylska (Inga)
Barbara Horawianka (Anna-Maria Elken)
Barbara Rachwalska (Berta)
Tobias Yves Zintel (2 roles: Austrian autistic, Nazi autistic)
Stanisław Milski (Miller)
Zygmunt Zintel (Schenk)
Aleksander Fogiel (Polish colonel)
Janusz Zakrzeński (Wernitz)
Zygmunt Kęstowicz (Ohlers)
Józef Duriasz (Lüboff)
Saturnin Żórawski (Fahrenwirst)
Wieńczysław Gliński (general Harris)
Tadeusz Pluciński (captain Roberts)
Zbigniew Zapasiewicz (captain Karpinski)
Ryszard Pietruski (lt. Lewis)
Włodzimierz Skoczylas (Vogel)
Barbara Sołtysik (radiooperator Marta)
Wiktor Grotowicz (general William)
Ferdynand Matysik (colonel Litzke)
Zbigniew Józefowicz (Soviet general)

List of episodes 
I Know Who You Are (Wiem, kim jesteś) dir. Janusz Morgenstern
Hotel Excelsior (Hotel Excelsior) dir. Andrzej Konic
Top Secret (Ściśle tajne) dir. Janusz Morgenstern
Café Rose (Café Rose)  dir. Andrzej Konic
Last Chance (Ostatnia szansa)  dir. Andrzej Konic
Iron Cross (Żelazny Krzyż) dir. Janusz Morgenstern
Double Nelson (Podwójny nelson) dir. Janusz Morgenstern
The Great Give-Away (Wielka wsypa) dir. Janusz Morgenstern
Colonel Kraft's ingenious plan (Genialny plan pułkownika Krafta) dir. Janusz Morgenstern
In the Name of the Republic (W imieniu Rzeczypospolitej) dir. Janusz Morgenstern
Password (Hasło)  dir. Andrzej Konic
Treason (Zdrada)   dir. Andrzej Konic
Without Instructions (Bez instrukcji) dir. Janusz Morgenstern
Edyta  dir. Andrzej Konic
Siege (Oblężenie)  dir. Andrzej Konic
Operation: "Oak Leaf" (Akcja - "Liść dębu") dir. Janusz Morgenstern
Meeting (Spotkanie)  dir. Andrzej Konic
Wanted Gruppenführer Wolf (Poszukiwany Gruppenführer Wolf) dir. Andrzej Konic

In other media
Several episodes of the series were adapted as short stories and collected in printed volumes. The show was also adapted as a comic book series, which gained high popularity and was translated into several languages. 20 volumes of the comic book were released, some of which were direct adaptations of the TV series, while others contained original storylines. The final volume of the comic book series expanded the show's story further, by having Kloss track down Nazi fugitives in Switzerland, shortly after the war.

See also 
Czterej pancerni i pies
 Hans Kloss (video game)

References

External links
 Webpage "Stawka większa niż życie - Hans Kloss - Stawka większa niż śmierć" (pl)
 Webpage "Kapitán Kloss - S nasazením života" (cz)

Polish drama television series
1967 Polish television series debuts
1968 Polish television series endings
Television shows based on Polish novels
Television shows set in Warsaw
Television shows set in Kraków
World War II television drama series
Television shows adapted into video games